The Hilltopper was a passenger train operated by Amtrak in the Mid-Atlantic region of the United States. It ran daily from South Station in Boston, Massachusetts to Catlettsburg station in Catlettsburg, Kentucky. The  run made 34 stops in 11 states and the District of Columbia.

History

The Chicago-Norfolk Mountaineer, introduced in 1975, suffered from low ridership and high costs. Despite its failings, West Virginia senator Robert Byrd demanded that Amtrak replace it with another train on the Norfolk and Western Railway (N&W) to serve his rural constituents - and that the new train would use new Amfleet equipment and serve Washington, D.C. The Washington-Catlettsburg Hilltopper replaced the Mountaineer on June 1, 1977. The Hilltopper retained all Mountaineer stops between Catlettsburg and Petersburg, Virginia, while the James Whitcomb Riley (which had run combined with the Mountaineer west of Catlettsburg) continued to provide a Chicago connection. Only Norfolk and Suffolk, Virginia lost train service; a bus connection to Petersburg was provided.

The Hilltopper had warm supporters in Byrd and West Virginian congressman Harley Staggers but it was "cited by critics as an example of everything that was wrong with Amtrak". Beginning on January 8, 1978, the Hilltopper was combined with the Night Owl, creating through service from Boston to Catlettsburg, Kentucky. Even with this effort to improve its farebox recovery ratio, the train averaged 33 passengers per trip in 1978, dropping to between 2 and 15 per trip in 1979. Farebox recovery was a dismal 25%, with the train losing $200,000 per year.

The Hilltopper was one of five routes cut on October 1, 1979 as part of a reorganization by the Carter Administration, and the only of the five where no federal injunctions were obtained to keep service running. Many of the train's riders were former N&W employees with lifetime passes. The Night Owl continued to be run after the cut. 

The end of the Hilltopper spelled the end of intercity rail service along much of its route in Southwest Virginia and West Virginia. However, one daily Northeast Regional round trip was extended from Lynchburg to Roanoke on October 31, 2017.

Proposed restored service
As recently as October 2019, passenger rail advocates are pushing for restoration of east-west service from Christiansburg and the Blue Ridge Mountains to the Hampton Roads area, via Roanoke, Lynchburg, Charlottesville, and Richmond with a "Commonwealth Corridor." This would be the first cross-Virginia passenger train since the Hilltopper.

References

External links 

1979 timetable

Former Amtrak routes
Passenger rail transportation in Massachusetts
Passenger rail transportation in Rhode Island
Passenger rail transportation in Connecticut
Passenger rail transportation in New York (state)
Passenger rail transportation in New Jersey
Passenger rail transportation in Pennsylvania
Passenger rail transportation in Delaware
Passenger rail transportation in Maryland
Passenger rail transportation in Washington, D.C.
Passenger rail transportation in Virginia
Passenger rail transportation in West Virginia
Passenger rail transportation in Kentucky
Railway services introduced in 1977
Railway services discontinued in 1979
Former long distance Amtrak routes